Events in the year 1931 in Belgium.

Incumbents
Monarch – Albert I
Prime Minister – Henri Jaspar (to 6 June); Jules Renkin (from 6 June)

Events
 12 July – William Grover-Williams and Caberto Conelli win the 1931 Belgian Grand Prix at Spa-Francorchamps

Publications
 Le Journal des Poètes begins publication.

Art and architecture
Buildings
 Boerentoren, Antwerp, completed

Births
 5 September – Rik Boel, judge (died 2020)

Deaths
 12 May – Eugène Ysaÿe (born 1858), violinist

References

 
1930s in Belgium
Belgium
Years of the 20th century in Belgium
Belgium